Ancienne Douane ("old custom house") is the name of several ancient buildings in France, among which: 

Ancienne Douane (Colmar)
Ancienne Douane (Haguenau)
Ancienne Douane (Strasbourg)